Dor Jok (born 27 February 2001) is an Australian professional footballer who plays as a forward for Port Melbourne. He previously played in the A-League Men for Central Coast Mariners.

References

External links

Living people
Australian soccer players
Association football midfielders
Melbourne Knights FC players
Central Coast Mariners FC players
National Premier Leagues players
A-League Men players
2001 births
South Sudanese emigrants to Australia